The Kareldi was a name assigned by Norman Tindale to Aboriginal Australian peoples of the state of Queensland. There were two groups that went by this name, the Garandi (Karandi), after the Garandi language, and the Gkuthaarn (Kutanda, Kuthant, Kotanda), after the Gkuthaarn language. It is not clear if they constituted a single people, but it appears that there were two dialects in the same area.

In addition, Tindale said that "Kotanda", sometimes used for both the Gkuthaarn  and Garandi languages but also applied to the Kalibamu people, was also sometimes used for the Kareldi people.

Country
Their domain included Karumba and the Swinburne River. Their inland extension went as far as Milgarra, Maggieville, and Stirling.

Frontier wars
When European settlers moved into the Gulf of Carpentaria region and established Normanton in the 1870s, there were an estimated seven Aboriginal peoples in the area, and the frontier wars blurred and confused the boundaries of traditional lands. By the 1920s, many Aboriginal people had been forcibly removed to Aboriginal reserves and missions. The Gkuthaarn and Kukatj people who remained lived in camps along the south-western side of the town, while others, such as the Kurtijar people, camped north of the Norman River.

Native title

Their recognition as traditional owners of the land, eight years after lodging the claim, allows the two groups to fish, hunt and practise their culture and their cultural ceremonies on pastoral land.

Alternative names
 Karundi, Karunti, Kurandi, Karantee, Karrandi, Karrandee.
 Gar-und-yih
 Kanin. (kanin means 'scrub,')
 Gooran. (scrub people)
 Kotanda. – a name usually used for the Kalibamu
 Kutanda.
 Goothanto.

Language

It is not clear whether the Gkuthaarn (Kutanda) and Garandi (Karandi) were the same language, or different dialects.

Some words
According to W.E. Armit, inspector of Native Police in 1886, these were some words of the "Karrandee tribe":

 irruag (tame dog)
 nyet (father)
 mooruk (mother)
 morbuy (whiteman)
 irruag (tame dog)
 nyet (father)
 mooruk (mother)
 morbuy (whiteman)

Indigenous rangers
The Gkuthaarn Kukatj Indigenous Land & Sea Ranger group is a group of Indigenous rangers made up of Kukatj and Gkuthaarn people, help to protect the natural resources and cultural heritage of the southern Gulf of Carpentaria region. The group is managed by the Carpentaria Land Council Aboriginal Corporation (CLCAC).

Notes

Citations

Sources

Aboriginal peoples of Queensland